Mikhail Uladzimiravich Siamionau (born 30 July 1984 in Minsk) is a Belarusian wrestler.

Siamionau won a bronze medal in men's Greco-Roman wrestling in the  category at the 2008 Beijing Olympic Games.

References

Wrestlers at the 2008 Summer Olympics
Olympic wrestlers of Belarus
Olympic bronze medalists for Belarus
Olympic medalists in wrestling
Medalists at the 2008 Summer Olympics
1984 births
Living people
European Games competitors for Belarus
Wrestlers at the 2015 European Games
Belarusian male sport wrestlers
21st-century Belarusian people
20th-century Belarusian people
Sportspeople from Minsk